E. J. Smith may refer to:

Politicians
Edward J. Smith (American politician) (1927–2010), American politician
Edward J. Smith (Canadian politician) (1819–1903), Canadian politician

Other
Eddie Smith (basketball) (born 1983), basketball player
Edward Smith (sea captain) (1850–1912), captain of the RMS Titanic
E. J. Smith (American football) (born 2002), American football player

See also
 J. E. Smith
 J. Smith (disambiguation)

 Smith (disambiguation)
 List of people with the surname Smith